The Remington Model 10 is a pump-action shotgun designed in 1908 by John Pedersen for Remington Arms. It has an internal striker within the bolt and a tube magazine which loaded and ejected from a port in the bottom of the receiver. An updated version, the Model 29, was introduced in 1930 with improvements made by C.C. Loomis.

Military use
The United States military used a short-barreled version known variously as the "trench" or "riot" shotgun. The Winchester Model 1897 was the major production, but Remington made 3500 of the Model 10-A version for issue to U.S. troops during World War I.  The Model 10 was modified by reducing barrel length to 23 inches (58 cm) and adding sling swivels, a wooden heat shield over the barrel, and an adapter with bayonet lug for affixing a M1917 bayonet.  These trench guns with serial numbers between 128000 and 166000 were stamped with US and the flaming bomb insignia on the left side of the receiver. The United States military also purchased a number of Remington Model 10 with 20-inch (51-cm) barrels for guarding prisoners, and 26 to 30-inch (66 to 76-cm) barrels for training aerial gunners.  The Model 10-A was used in limited numbers by the Marine Corps through the 1930s.

References

External links

Pump-action shotguns
Remington Arms firearms
World War I infantry weapons of the United States
United States Marine Corps equipment
Shotguns of the United States
Weapons of the Philippine Army